Shpëtim Babaj Croatian Špetim Babaj) (born on 9 December 1981 in Pristina) is a Kosovo Albanian retired football midfielder. He also holds Croatian citizenship.

External links
 
 Profile in early career at Strukljeva.net
 Stats from Slovenia at PrvaLiga.
 
 Career at Soccer.ru.

1981 births
Living people
Sportspeople from Pristina
Kosovo Albanians
Association football midfielders
Kosovan footballers
NK Rudar Velenje players
NK Šmartno ob Paki players
FK Besiana players
Besa Kavajë players
KF Elbasani players
FC Zorya Luhansk players
FC Shakhter Karagandy players
KS Gramozi Ersekë players
KF Tirana players
KF Trepça'89 players
KF Hajvalia players
KF Ferizaj players
Slovenian PrvaLiga players
Ukrainian Premier League players
Kategoria Superiore players
Kosovan expatriate footballers
Expatriate footballers in Slovenia
Kosovan expatriate sportspeople in Slovenia
Expatriate footballers in Albania
Kosovan expatriate sportspeople in Albania
Expatriate footballers in Ukraine
Kosovan expatriate sportspeople in Ukraine
Expatriate footballers in Kazakhstan
Kosovan expatriate sportspeople in Kazakhstan